Heinz Schussig (9 October 1926 – 4 January 1994) was a German footballer who played as a defender for Arminia Bielefeld, Eintracht Osnabrück, SV Saar 05 Saarbrücken and the Saarland national team.

In 1956 he emigrated to Australia. With Hakoah he won the Kennard Cup in 1957. He later moved to Canberra where he played for Australian Capital Territory first division clubs Napad and Concordia.

References

1926 births
1994 deaths
German footballers
Saar footballers
Footballers from Dortmund
Association football defenders
Saarland international footballers
Saarland B international footballers
Arminia Bielefeld players
SV Saar 05 Saarbrücken players
Hakoah Sydney City East FC players
German expatriate footballers
German expatriate sportspeople in Australia
Expatriate soccer players in Australia